Bianca Rose St-Georges (born July 28, 1997) is a Canadian professional soccer player who plays as a left-back for National Women's Soccer League club Chicago Red Stars and the Canadian national team.

Early life
St-Georges was born and raised in Saint-Charles-Borromée, Quebec to a Canadian father and an American mother. She began playing soccer at age five with St-Félix De Valois. Afterwards, she played with AS Laser. At age 13, she joined the Canadian REX program in Quebec.

College career
St-Georges attended West Virginia University, where she played for the women's soccer team. She was the 2018 Big 12 Conference Defensive Player of the Year.

Club career
St-Georges was selected in the third round (20th overall) by the Chicago Red Stars in the 2019 NWSL College Draft, being the only Canadian player to be drafted. However, her rookie season was delayed until the following year, as she suffered a meniscus tear in her knee. She made her debut for Chicago Red Stars on June 28, 2020 against the Washington Spirit in the 2020 NWSL Challenge Cup. She scored her first professional goal and assist came in the Challenge Cup Semi-final against Sky Blue FC on July 23, 2020, and helped the Red Stars reach the final, where they ultimately finished second. In 2021, the Red Stars finished as runner-ups in the 2021 NWSL playoffs.

International career
St.Georges began playing with the Canada U17 team at the 2013 CONCACAF Women's U-17 Championship, helping them to win the silver medal and subsequently at the 2014 FIFA U-17 Women's World Cup.

She also was a part of the Canada U20 team U-20 team that won silver at the 2015 CONCACAF Women's U-20 Championship and played at the 2016 FIFA U-20 Women's World Cup.

She was invited to the Canadian senior team camp for the first time in February 2021. However, during the camp she suffered a meniscus tear in her knee (the opposite knee from her previous injury in 2019). She made her debut for the Canadian senior team on June 11, 2021 in a friendly against the Czech Republic. She was one of the final cuts from the team ahead of the 2020 Olympics (held in 2021), where Canada won gold.

References

External links

 

1997 births
Living people
Canadian women's soccer players
Chicago Red Stars players
National Women's Soccer League players
Chicago Red Stars draft picks
West Virginia Mountaineers women's soccer players
Canadian people of American descent
Canadian expatriate women's soccer players
Expatriate women's soccer players in the United States
Canadian expatriate sportspeople in the United States
Women's association football fullbacks
Canada women's international soccer players